Dispatch was an 18-gun, Albatross-class brig-sloop, launched in 1795 and intended for the British Royal Navy, but sold to the Imperial Russian Navy before commissioning. Between 1796 and 1805 she served in the North Sea and the Baltic Sea. She was wrecked in 1805.

Origins
Vice-Admiral Khanykov reported to St Petersburg, in a dispatch discussed there on  1796, that he had purchased Dispatch at the behest of Catherine the Great, and that she was being fitted out and would be handed over to Russia.

Dispatch was transferred to Russia under an Admiralty Order dated 28 January 1796. However, British records show that she was struck from the Navy List and handed over at Chatham to the Russian Navy in March.

Russian naval service
Dispatch left Britain for Russia on  1796, with the Russian fleet. Between 1796 and 1797, Dispatch served with the squadrons of Vice-Admiral Pyotr Khanykov and Vice-Admiral Mikhail Makarov, cruising between Copenhagen and England. In May 1797 she sailed with Makarov's First Division from Kronstadt, arriving in Britain in July.

Between 1798 and 1800 Makarov's Division operated in the North Sea and off the Texel. Initially, she served primarily as an advice boat, carrying messages between flagships. Later, she patrolled in the North Sea. On  1800 she left for Russia.

Then in 1801, Dispatch carried a courier to Britain. She spent 1802-03 cruising in the Baltic, and in 1805 escorted transports to Germany.

Fate
Dispatch was wrecked off Rügen on  1805 during a storm. No people died.

Citations and references
Citations

References
Materialy dlya istorii russkogo flota (Materials for the history of the Russian fleet), Vol. 14 (1796).
 
 

1795 ships
Ships built in Chatham
Ships of the Imperial Russian Navy
Maritime incidents in 1805
Albatross-class sloops
Shipwrecks in the Baltic Sea
Shipwrecks of Germany